Toccopola Creek is a stream in the U.S. state of Mississippi.

Toccopola Creek took its name from an old Indian village which once stood in the area; its name in turn is derived from the Chickasaw language purported to mean "dismal prairie".

References

Rivers of Mississippi
Rivers of Lafayette County, Mississippi
Rivers of Pontotoc County, Mississippi
Mississippi placenames of Native American origin